Christian Warlich  (5 January 1891 – 27 February 1964) was a Hamburg based tattooist who professionalised tattooing in Germany. He supposedly was the first one to use an electric tattoo machine in Germany.

Biographical and career information
Warlich was born and raised in Hannover-Linden. He left his parental home at the age of 14, went to Dortmund and reportedly became a boilermaker. He went to sea and might have had contact with tattooists in the US. He got married in 1914 in Hamburg and opened a pub at Kieler Straße 44 (today Clemens-Schultz-Straße) around 1919. There was a separate area where he tattooed. His grandson and Theodor Vetter, a close friend of the family, worked as a business tout for Warlich.
According to his own account Warlich tattooed „everything the male body should express […] politics, eroticism, athleticism, aesthetics, religion, in all colours, at every location.“ Though, in the context of a legal dispute about a face tattoo which was done by a competitor, Warlich claimed „a decent tattooer does not tattoo a face.“

In over 40 years of working as a tattooist he had more than 50.000 customers, also Prince Axel and Prince Viggo from the Danish Royal family.  Warlich died at work in his pub.

After Warlich's death Theodor Vetter (Tattoo Theo) took care of a part of the estate, the second part, including the famous flash book (Vorlagealbum) and photos, was sold to the Museum für Hamburgische Geschichte in 1965. So it was possible to show Warlich's flash book in the exhibit „Wohin mit der Stadt“ in 2013. The Museum für Hamburgische Geschichte is planning to re-publish the Vorlagealbum, which was previously brought out by Stephan Oettermann. In 1981, he published the album with an accompanying text in cooperation with the museum. Although, over the next ten years, three editions of the volume were published, it is no longer available today.
Oettermann's publication was a groundbreaking and pioneering work. However, the low reproduction quality of the images do not entirely do justice to Warlich's work. The quality of the original designs deviates strikingly from that of the reproductions. Therefore, a completely new and appropriate edition is planned.

Research Projekt

The Hamburg-based art historian Ole Wittmann was the head of the research project „Der Nachlass des Hamburger Tätowierers Christian Warlich (1891–1964)“ – also known as „Nachlass Warlich“ – which is carried out in cooperation with the Museum für Hamburgische Geschichte. Wittmann is a postdoc scholarship holder of the Hamburg Foundation for the Promotion of Science and Culture (Hamburger Stiftung zur Förderung von Wissenschaft und Kultur).

The exhibition Tattoo Legends. Christian Warlich in St Pauli was on display in the Museum of Hamburg History from 27 November 2019. It was a large-scale show about Warlich, who became known as the ‘King of Tattooists’ and is considered one of the most important tattooists of the 20th century. On 13 March 2020 the museum was suddenly closed to visitors due to the COVID 19 pandemic.

On March 20 the exhibition was the only current international special exhibition that could be visited online. A show that had already been declared dead was reanimated only a few days after the sudden lockdown and there was active participation of a community in the topic of tattoo history. In addition, the online tour allowed virtual excursions and curatorial tours, among others for a seminar at the Christian-Albrechts-University of Kiel.

The virtual tour was awarded gold at the Annual Multimedia Award 2021 in the category ‘Events on the Internet’.

See also
List of tattoo artists
 official website of the project  "Nachlass Warlich"

Selected bibliography
 Spamer, Adolf: Die Tätowierung in den deutschen Hafenstädten. Ein Versuch zur Erfassung ihrer Formen und ihres Bildgutes. Markus Eberwein und Werner Petermann, München: Trickster 1993, ; first publ. 1933 (in: Niederdeutsche Zeitschrift für Volkskunde, Nr. 11, 1933, Page 1–55; 129–182).
 Feige, Marcel: Tattoo-Theo: Der Tätowierte vom Kiez. Die Biographie der großen Hamburger Tattoo-Legende . Schwarzkopf & Schwarzkopf, 2001, .
 Feige, Marcel: Ein Tattoo ist für immer. Schwarzkopf & Schwarzkopf, Berlin 2002, .
 Wittmann, Ole: Tattoos in der Kunst. Materialität - Motive - Rezeption. Reimer,  Berlin 2017, .
 Bauche, Ulrich : Nachlass des Tätowierers Christian Warlich. Beiträge zur deutschen Volks- und Altertumskunde, 11. Bd. 1967, Page 107–108.
 Wittmann, Ole: Tattoo-Legenden“, Hamburg History Live, Nr. 2, 2016, Page 16–21.
 Heim, Heide: Der Heilige Gral“, TätowierMagazin, Nr. 248, Jg. 22, Oktober 2016, Page 74–83.

References

External links
  Ross Howerton : Flash from the Past: The King of Tattoos, Christian Warlich
 ndr.de, german TV: Auf den Spuren von Christian Warlich (German)
 Christian Warlich: On TV first time since 1950s. NDR - DAS! - 26 Oct. 2016

1891 births
Artists from Hamburg
German tattoo artists
1964 deaths